Bay Village may refer to:

United States
Bay Village, Boston, Massachusetts, a neighborhood
Bay Village, Ohio, a city

Australia
Stockland Bay Village, a shopping centre in Bateau Bay, New South Wales